Aleksandr Kulik (born 23 July 1981) is an Estonian professional footballer.

Kulik was born in Sillamäe, and plays in the Estonian Meistriliiga for JK Sillamäe Kalev. He plays the position of defender or striker and is 1.93 m tall.

External links
Narva Trans FC profile

1981 births
Living people
Sportspeople from Sillamäe
Estonian footballers
Estonian people of Russian descent
JK Sillamäe Kalev players
FC Flora players
Viljandi JK Tulevik players
Estonian expatriate footballers
FC Zhenis Astana players
Estonian expatriate sportspeople in Kazakhstan
Expatriate footballers in Kazakhstan
Rovaniemen Palloseura players
Meistriliiga players
Veikkausliiga players
Kazakhstan Premier League players
Expatriate footballers in Finland
JK Narva Trans players
Association football forwards
Association football defenders